This standing stone is located in the townland of Clontead More,  north of Coachford village. It is not depicted on the 1842 or 1901 surveyed OS maps.

The Irish Tourist Association survey of 1944 describes it as a 'dolmen' on a farm in Clontead Mor, 0.5 miles from Coachford. Consisting of a single boulder of c. 3 ton in weight and lying flat in the corner of a field, it was alleged to have been thrown by the giant Mushera from his lair on Mushera Mountain. The 'marks of his fingers' were said to be still visible.

The Archaeological Inventory of county Cork describes it as being on a south facing slope, in pasture, sub-rectangular in plan, with a height of 1.12m and long axis NE-SW.

Single upright stones are common in Ireland and not necessarily of one time period or serving the same purpose. Some mark prehistoric burials, others had commemorative or ritual functions, and some served as boundary markers along ancient routeways. Those with a NE-SW long axis suggest affinity with stone rows and pairs, and may date to the Bronze Age.

The standing stone is located on private property, and is not accessible to the public.

References

External links
 OS Discovery Series map (maps.osi.ie)
 acrheritage.info

Megalithic monuments in Ireland